Zygmunt Karol Radziwiłł (1591-1642) was a Polish-Lithuanian noble, komorzy stolowicki from 1614, poznanski from 1625, krajczy of the queen from 1617, krajczy or Lithuania from 1633, podczaszy of Lithuania from 1638, voivode of Nowogródek from 1642, member of Knights Hospitaller (kawaler maltański), patron of Knight Hospitallers centers in Poznań and Stwołowce (in Lithuania).

In 1621 took part in the Battle of Chocim, commander of mercenaries Lisowczycy in 1622 during the period of their service in the Holy Roman Empire.

After the death of his older brother, Albrycht Władysław Radziwiłł, he inherited ordynacja of Nieśwież in 1636, but gave it up to his brother Aleksander Ludwik Radziwiłł.

Born on 4 December 1591 in Nieśwież, died on 5 November 1642 in Assisi. Son of Mikołaj Krzysztof "Sierotka" Radziwiłł and Halszka Eufemia Wiśniowiecka.

External links 
 picture

Secular senators of the Polish–Lithuanian Commonwealth
Zygmunt Karol
People from Nesvizh
1591 births
1642 deaths